Rosillo Creek begins approximately 0.5 miles north of FM 1976, in northeastern Bexar County, Texas, within the city limits of Windcrest, Texas, and flows southwestward for 18 miles through the Rosillo Creek Basin.  The creek has an elevation ranging from 265 meters above sea level, to 155 meters above sea level.  The vegetation of the basin is mostly mesquite trees and grasses.  Rosillo Creek empties into Salado Creek in southeastern Bexar County.

History
Rosillo Creek was given its name in 1716 by Spanish explorer Domingo Ramón.  It was the site of the Battle of Rosillo Creek in 1813.

See also
List of rivers of Texas

References
 Arc Hydro GIS for Water Resources, David R. Maidment, editor, 2002 GIS for Water Resources, CE394K handouts, Federal Emergency Management Agency (FEMA).
 Texas Water Quality Inventory, Texas Commission on Environmental Quality, Rosillo Creek Basin, 2001.

Rivers of Bexar County, Texas